Radio A is a Bosnian local commercial radio station, broadcasting from Banja Luka, Bosnia and Herzegovina.

This radio station broadcasts a variety of programs such as music, talk show and local news. The owner of the radio station is ATV.

Alternativna TV bought Radio Igokea, which was owned by Gorica Dodik, the daughter of Milorad Dodik, and the Igokea Basketball Club. This radio, which was previously renamed "Agape", will operate as "A radio" in the future.

Radio A was founded on 3 September 2019 when local radio station Radio Agape was rebranded. "A radio" from Laktaši moved to Banja Luka and is located in the ATV building. According to media reports, Drahmi Miskin took over the position of director from Ivana Dodik, the wife of Dodik's son Igor.

Estimated number of listeners of A Radio is around 218.355.

The program is mainly produced in Serbian, 24 hours a day, and it is available in the territory of Banja Luka and Lijevče polje area.

Frequencies 
 Banja Luka

See also 
 List of radio stations in Bosnia and Herzegovina
 Nes Radio
 Pop FM
 Big Radio 1

References

External links 
 www.www.atvbl.com
 www.www.radiomap.eu
 www.fmscan.org
 Communications Regulatory Agency of Bosnia and Herzegovina

Banja Luka
Radio stations established in 2019

Mass media in Banja Luka